Vrasna (Vrasná ) is a village and a community of the Volvi municipality. Before the 2011 local government reform it was part of the municipality of Agios Georgios. The 2011 census recorded 278 inhabitants in the village and 2,879 inhabitants in the community. The community of Vrasna covers an area of 41.127 km2.

According to the statistics of Vasil Kanchov ("Macedonia, Ethnography and Statistics"), 850 Greek Christians lived in the village in 1900.

Administrative division
The community of Vrasna consists of three settlements:
 Nea Vrasna
 Paliampela
 Vrasna

Population
According to the 2011 census, the population of the community of Vrasna was 2,879 people, an increase of almost 12% compared with the population of the previous census of 2001.

See also
 List of settlements in the Thessaloniki regional unit

References

Populated places in Thessaloniki (regional unit)